Young Chimodzi is a Malawian football manager and former player. A defender, he made 159 appearances for the Malawi national team and won a bronze medal with Malawi at the 1987 All-Africa Games in Nairobi. At club level he played for Silver Strikers FC, captaining the team until 1999.

He later managed the Malawi national team between January 2014 and June 2015.

See also
 List of men's footballers with 100 or more international caps

References

Living people
Malawian footballers
Association football defenders
Silver Strikers FC players
Malawi international footballers
FIFA Century Club
1984 African Cup of Nations players
Competitors at the 1987 All-Africa Games
Malawian football managers
African Games bronze medalists for Malawi
African Games medalists in football
Malawi national football team managers
Year of birth missing (living people)